Thomas "Tommy" Rodney (June 4, 1744 – January 2, 1811) was an American lawyer and politician from Jones Neck in St. Jones Hundred, Kent County, Delaware and Natchez, Mississippi. He was a Continental Congressman from Delaware, and a member of the Democratic-Republican Party who served in the Delaware General Assembly, as Justice of the Delaware Supreme Court, and as federal judge for the Mississippi Territory. He was the younger brother of Caesar Rodney, Revolutionary President of Delaware.

Family and early life

Rodney was born June 4, 1744 at Byfield, his family's farm at Jones Neck, in Dover Hundred, Kent County, Delaware. It is just north of John Dickinson's mansion, Poplar Hall. He was the son of Caesar and Mary Crawford Rodney, and grandson of William Rodney, who came to America in the 1680s and had been Speaker of the Colonial Assembly of the Lower Counties in 1704. His mother was the daughter of the Rev. Thomas Crawford,  Anglican priest at Dover. Byfield was an  farm where the work was done by enslaved people, and with the addition of other adjacent properties, the Rodneys were, by the standards of the day, wealthy members of the local gentry. Sufficient income was earned from the sale of wheat and barley to the Philadelphia and West Indies market to provide enough cash and leisure to allow members of the family to participate in the social and political life of Kent County. Rodney's father died in 1745, when he was an infant and his much older brother, Caesar Rodney became much involved in his rearing and education.

Political career
Rodney was very active in local politics, as well as the broader range of those elements affecting Delaware as whole. As early as 1770 he was a Justice of the Peace for Kent County and through the years he held many other local offices. He was a Colonel in the county's militia, and was involved in a number of actions during the American Revolutionary War.

In 1774 Thomas was a delegate to the state convention that elected his brother Caesar to be their delegate to the Continental Congress. Caesar went on to sign the Declaration of Independence. Meanwhile, Thomas was named to the state's Committee of Safety. Thomas in turn was sent as a delegate to the Congress in 1781 and 1782. He was elected to the Congress annually from 1785 to 1787, but attended sessions only in 1786. Through these same years Thomas was also a member in Delaware's state Assembly, and served as its Speaker of the House in 1787.

On December 17, 1802 Rodney became an associate justice of Delaware's Supreme Court. He would serve only until August 1803. He resigned since President Jefferson appointed him as the chief justice for the Mississippi Territory. He bought land in what was then Jefferson County, Mississippi and moved to Natchez to assume his new duties as the senior federal judge for the Mississippi Territory from 1803 to 1811.

Death and legacy
Thomas Rodney died January 2, 1811, at Natchez, Mississippi. The community of Rodney, in Jefferson County, Mississippi is named in his honor. His son, Caesar A. Rodney, served as the U.S. representative from Delaware, U.S. senator from Delaware, U.S. attorney general and U.S. minister to Argentina.

Public offices
At this time Delaware elections were held the first of October. Members of the House of Assembly took office on the twentieth day of October for a term of one year. Seven Assemblymen were elected, at large, from each county. The General Assembly chose the Continental Congressmen for a term of one year.

References

External links

Places with more information
Delaware Historical Society website, 505 Market St., Wilmington, Delaware (302) 655-7161
University of Delaware Library website, 181 South College Ave., Newark, Delaware (302) 831-2965
Newark Free Library 750 Library Ave., Newark Delaware (302) 731-7550.
Corbit-Calloway Memorial Library 2nd and High St. Odessa, Delaware (302) 378-8838.
Rodney, Mississippi Rodney, Mississippi Mississippi Town Named After Thomas Rodney

1744 births
1811 deaths
18th-century American politicians
19th-century American lawyers
Continental Congressmen from Delaware
Delaware lawyers
Mississippi Territory judges
People from Kent County, Delaware
Politicians from Natchez, Mississippi
Speakers of the Delaware House of Representatives
Rodney family of Delaware